Sergey Aleksandrovich Dvoryankov (born 12 December 1969) is a Russian professional football manager.

Career
He began his coaching career in the FC Dordoi Bishkek. Since 15 September 2012 until 31 May 2014 he was a coach of the Kyrgyzstan national football team.

References

External links
 
 
 
 Sergey Dvoryankov coach profile at Soccerpunter.com
 

1969 births
Living people
Russian football managers
Expatriate football managers in Kyrgyzstan
FC Dordoi Bishkek managers
Kyrgyzstan national football team managers
Sportspeople from Moscow
Russian expatriate football managers
Russian expatriate sportspeople in Kyrgyzstan